M3 - Midsummer Midnight Mumbai is a 2014 musical-thriller film produced by Gudnet Production. The film stars Sara Khan alongside newcomers Pooja Thakur and Paras Chhabra as well as supporting roles Milind Gunaji, Kiran Kumar, Pramod Moutho, Mushtaq Khan and Raju Kher.

Cast
 Sara Khan as Sapna
Paras Chhabra as Rahul
 Pooja Thakur as Nisha
 Milind Gunaji as Police Commissioner
 Pramod Moutho as Music Company Owner
 M A Guddu as ACP
 Shiva Rindan as Sapna's Uncle
 Suman Gupta as Police Officer
 Suraj K Shah as suraj
 Dileep Sinha as ACP
 Mushtaq Khan
 Raju Kher
 Kiran Kumar

Soundtrack
The music was composed by Sujeet Chaubey, Afroz Khan, Dushyant Kumar.

Track list

References

External links
 

2010s Hindi-language films